Şekerpare is a 1983 Turkish comedy film directed by Atıf Yılmaz.

Cast 
 İlyas Salman - Cumali
 Şener Şen - Ziver Bey
 Yaprak Özdemiroğlu - Sekerpare
 Ayşen Gruda - Peyker
 Şevket Altuğ - Hursit
 Neriman Köksal - Letafet
  - Afet
  - Galatali
 Serra Yılmaz - Mahmure 
 Ayten Erman - Hamdune
  - Nazir

References

External links 

1980s adventure films
Turkish adventure films